Charles Marie Louis Joseph Sarrabezolles (27 December 1888 – 11 February 1971), also known as Carlo Sarrabezolles (or Charles or Charles-Marie), was a French sculptor.

Life
Sarrabezolles was born in Toulouse, studied at that city's École des Beaux-Arts (1904–1907), then from 1907 to 1914 at the École des Beaux-Arts in Paris, where he settled for good. In 1914 he was runner-up (premier second) in Prix de Rome competition. From 1914 to 1918, during World War I, he was held prisoner in Germany. In 1920 he married Nicole Cervi, with whom he had three children. In 1923 they moved into a studio at 16 rue des Volontaires where he remained until his death. A square there, in the 15th arrondissement of Paris, bears his name.

His best-known work is probably The Soul of France, which he executed in three different materials:  the first in plaster in 1921, the second in stone in 1922, and the last in bronze in 1930. In 1926 the sculptor developed a method of direct carving in setting concrete, and much of his subsequent work was integrated with architecture, particularly in collaboration with architect Paul Tournon, and in monumental scale.

Sarrabezolles was a member or president of artistic associations including Art Monumental, the Salon des Artistes Français, and the Foundation Taylor.

Selected works
 1920–1922 – first monumental work, The Soul of France, winning National Prize and silver medal at the Salon
 1925 – The Triumphal Dance of Pallas Athena and The Virgin of Peace exhibited at the Exposition Internationale des Arts Décoratifs et Industriels Modernes
 1926 – tower, Villemomble Church (Seine-St-Denis). Invention of direct carving in setting concrete
 1928–1929 – façade and bell tower, Elisabethville Church (Yvelines), with architect Paul Tournon
 1928–1933 – bronze finial group Liberté - Égalité - Fraternité for the French Embassy, Belgrade, Serbia, for architect Roger-Henri Expert
 1929 – Two Legendary Giants depicting the legendary Lydéric and Phinaert, bell tower, Lille (Nord) town hall. Also executed in direct carving of setting concrete.
 1930 – monumental fountain, Nemours Mansion and Gardens, Wilmington, Delaware, USA.
 1930 – Marcella Miller du Pont, portrait bust in marble, University of Denver, Colorado, USA
 1931 – war memorial for the RATP, Richelieu – Drouot (Paris Metro)
 1931 – architectural bas-relief La gloire de la Seine, near Pont Neuf, Paris
 1931 – Four human races in concrete, belltower, Notre-Dame-des-Missions-du-cygne d'Enghien, with architect Paul Tournon
 1932 – bust of Edouard Branly, Jardin du Luxembourg
 1932 – Genie de la Mer (Spirit of the Sea), ocean liner SS Normandie, for French architect Roger-Henri Expert
 1934–1935 – decorations, Église du Saint-Esprit (Paris, 12th arrondissement) and church of St-Louis, Marseille. Direct carving in concrete
 1937 – exhibited The Elements, north wing of the Palais de Chaillot, Exposition Internationale
 1950 – Monument to the Glory of the Resistance of the people of the Jura Mountains, Lons-le-Saunier (Jura)
 1951 – Faculty of Medicine (Paris): three medallion reliefs. From this time onwards, he made many busts, portraits for medals, decorative schemes for school buildings etc.
 1963 – La Antillaise (The West Indian Woman), Fort de France, Martinique

Gallery

References
 Carlo Sarrabezolles: sculpteur et statuaire 1888-1971, by Genevieve Sarrabezolles-Appert and  Marie-Odile Lefevre, Paris: Somogy, 2002. .
 Biography

External links
 

1888 births
1971 deaths
Concrete pioneers
French architectural sculptors
20th-century French sculptors
French male sculptors